The 2018–19 Feyenoord Basketball season was the 65th season in the existence of the club. The club will play in the Dutch Basketball League (DBL) and NBB Cup. 

It was the first season as Feyenoord Basketball and the first season under head coach Richard den Os. On 2 March 2019, Den Os resigned as head coach, Jan Stalman replaced him as interim.

Players

Squad information

Transactions

In 

|}

Out 

|}

Dutch Basketball League

Playoffs

Quarterfinals

References

External links
 Official website

Feyenoord